Artillery Staff in the Swedish Army consisted of commanding officers from the artillery units and had the task of assisting the Master-General of the Ordnance and the Inspector of Artillery in all his activities related questions. It was active between 1807 and 1937.

History
The Artillery Staff was established in 1807 at the suggestion of General Helvig (Royal letter on 4 May 1807), succeeding the Artillery Committee of 1802. The duties of the Artillery Staff was to follow the artillery progress of science in Sweden and abroad, arrange tests and more. The head was the Inspector of Artillery. The Artillery Staff was at first mainly an administrative corps but in 1868 received the character of a government agency when a design office for drawing up the plans and regulations regarding the equipment was transferred to the staff. The office was transferred in 1890 to the Deputy Chief of Ordnance and in 1908 to the Artillery Department of the Royal Swedish Army Materiel Administration.

In 1874, a Statistical Department was added that would follow the artillery developments in Sweden and abroad, and in 1881 an Equipment Department was added which drew up lists of equipment. Finally in 1926, a Shooting School Department was added. According to the Defence Act of 1925, the Artillery Staff consisted of one colonel (chief of staff), two majors and 12 company officer from the artillery as well as one officer, commanded from the infantry, one expedition officer (retired officer), one non-commissioned expedition officer (retired non-commissioned officer) and one expedition guard. The Artillery Staff ceased in 1937. Its duties were taken over by the Artillery Inspectorate (Artilleriinspektionen) and the Artillery Staff Corps (Artilleristabskåren).

Uniforms 1807–1905
The Artillery Staff wore the artillery uniform m/1815, m/1845, and m/1872. As rank insignia a gold aiguilette m/18?? was worn on the right shoulder and a blue and yellow plume in the bicorne. The staff wore the same button as the General Staff Corps.

Commanding officers

1813–1815: Johan Didrik af Wingård
????–????: ?
1821–1825: Axel Gustaf von Arbin
1825–1829: Gustaf Adolf Fleming af Liebelitz
????–????: ?
1833–1835: Carl Silfverschiöld
????–????: ?
1837–1847: Anton Gabriel Gyldenstolpe (acting)
1848–1854: Fabian Jacob Wrede
1854–1857: Gillis Bildt  
1857–????: Carl Henrik Hägerflycht
1858–1861: Gustaf Lagercrantz
????–????: ?
1867–1870: Knut Erik Leijonhufvud
????–????: ?
1872–1883: Hjalmar Palmstierna
1883–1886: Henrik Albrecht von Stockenström
????–????: ?
1890–1895: Gottschalk Geijer
1895–1898: Anders Jacob (Jacques) Roland de Laval
1898–1902: Sune Gunnarsson Wennerberg
1902–1903: Gottschalk Geijer
1904–1909: Karl Toll
1909–1911: Ludvig Hammarskiöld
1912–1915: Gerdt August Lundeberg
1916–1921: Nils Edvard Ekelöf
1921–1925: Gunnar Salander
1925–1926: Sven Hjalmar Thorén
1925–1926: Johan Gustaf Henning Schmiterlöw (acting)
1926–1931: Per Sylvan
1932–1933: Johan Gustaf Henning Schmiterlöw (acting)
1933–1937: Johan Gustaf Henning Schmiterlöw

References

Notes

Print

Staff (military)
Military units and formations of the Swedish Army
Military units and formations established in 1807
Military units and formations disestablished in 1937
Disbanded units and formations of Sweden